Blackland is a rural unincorporated settlement in Charlotte County, New Brunswick, Canada, that is just north of St. Stephen.

References

Populated places in Charlotte County, New Brunswick